Randy J. Walker (May 29, 1954 – June 29, 2006) was an American football player and coach.  He served as the head football coach at Miami University from 1990 to 1998 and at Northwestern University from 1999 to 2005, compiling a career college football record of 96–81–5.  Walker won 59 games at Miami, more than noted coaches who preceded him such as Sid Gillman, Woody Hayes, Bo Schembechler, Bill Mallory, and Ara Parseghian.

Playing career
Walker had a standout season his last year in high school for the Troy Trojans in Troy, Ohio. He received recruiting offers from Big Ten schools like Northwestern University and Ohio State University, but choose instead to follow his high school sweetheart, Tammy, to Miami University (Tammy was a year older and already there).

He played three seasons at fullback for the Miami Redskins in Oxford under head coaches Bill Mallory and Dick Crum. His teammates included former Illinois coach Ron Zook and NFL standouts Rob Carpenter and Sherman Smith.

In his three years the team went 32–1–1 and was ranked #15 in 1973, #10 in 1974 and #12 in 1975. Miami won the Mid-American Conference in all three years. Miami also went to the Tangerine Bowl (presently the Capital One Bowl) where they beat Florida in 1973, Georgia in 1974 and South Carolina in 1975. In his senior year Walker was named the team's most valuable player. For his career he ran for 1757 yards.

He was drafted by the Cincinnati Bengals (1976; 13th round), but chose to become an assistant coach instead.

Coaching career
Walker was an assistant coach for the Miami Redskins (1976–1977; running backs), then the University of North Carolina Tar Heels (running backs coach 1978–1981; quarterbacks coach 1982–1985; offensive coordinator and quarterbacks coach 1985–1987), and finally the Northwestern Wildcats (1988–1989; running backs).

Miami
Walker became Miami's 30th head coach, succeeding Tim Rose whose contract was not renewed. In his first year the Redskins posted a 5–5–1 record, which was a vast improvement for a team that had only won two games in the two previous years. Walker made steady improvement in his nine years, culminating with a 10–1 record in his last year with the RedHawks. This team was led by record-breaking running back Travis Prentice. Walker finished with 59–35–5 record including several victories over ranked opponents from major conference such as #25 Northwestern in 1995, #12 Virginia Tech in 1997 and #12 North Carolina in 1998. However, he never won the Mid-American Conference Championship.

Northwestern
Randy Walker had a 37–46 career record at Northwestern. In 2000, Walker overhauled the offense and introduced the spread formation. Unlike most other spread offenses, Walker's featured a very strong running game.  His run game was so strong, in fact, that only one season in Walker's entire time at Northwestern did he fail to coach a 1000-yard rusher. This offense helped the Wildcats share the Big Ten title in his second year. He is third behind Pappy Waldorf in career victories. Walker also was the first Wildcat coach to lead three different teams to bowl games. In addition, he became the first Wildcat coach ever to guide three straight teams to four or more Big Ten wins.

Death
On June 29, 2006, Walker, who was only 52, died suddenly of an apparent heart attack, leaving the Northwestern community shocked and saddened. He had battled a viral heart infection in the fall of 2004.  On July 7, 2006 Pat Fitzgerald was named to replace him as head coach of the Wildcats.

Personal life
Born to Jim Walker, an accountant with Hobart Corporation, and Ruth Ann Walker, he grew up in Troy, Ohio and graduated from Troy High School, where he played fullback and defensive back on the 1971 team that was picked by the Dayton Daily News as the area's best team over the past 50 years.  As a student, he sang the lead in school musicals (including Tevye in Fiddler on the Roof), played the violin, and was active in student government. He graduated from Miami University in 1976 with a B.A. in social studies education and, in 1981, earned his master's degree in education administration.

He is survived by his wife and high-school sweetheart, Tammy (aka "Tamara"; née Weikert), and two children, daughter Abbey and son Jamie.

He met Tammy when he was on student council his junior year in high school. They were both put on a committee to plan a Thanksgiving dance in 1970. She was a senior and after she choose to attend Miami University he followed her there. They were married in 1975.

In an interview in 2000, Walker told Skip Myslenski of the Chicago Tribune that the defining moment in his life came in 1969. On a high school team that was rebuilding and led by undersized sophomores like himself, they were having a terrible season (they went 2–7–1). On the last play of the last game of the season, with the game tied 22–22 against powerful rival Dayton Wayne, the pass went to the 165-pound Walker. He was tackled 18 inches from the end zone. After the game his coach, James "Jim" Conard, made the entire team walk around with a piece of cloth that was 18 inches long, until the start of the 1970 season.

Walker gave up his first love, baseball, joined the track team for speed and stamina, and started lifting weights, gaining 30 pounds. Reporting to fall practice at 195 pounds, Walker's teams would not lose another game the remaining two seasons, going 20–0.

Head coaching record

References

 

1954 births
2006 deaths
American football fullbacks
Miami RedHawks football coaches
Miami RedHawks football players
North Carolina Tar Heels football coaches
Northwestern Wildcats football coaches
People from Troy, Ohio
Players of American football from Ohio